This is a list of Bangladeshi Test cricketers. A Test match is an international cricket match between two of the leading cricketing nations. The list is arranged in the order in which each player won his Test cap. Where more than one player won his first Test cap in the same Test match, those players are listed alphabetically by given name.

Key

Players
Statistics are correct as of 24 December 2022.

See also
 Test cricket
  Bangladesh national cricket team
 List of Bangladesh ODI cricketers
 List of Bangladesh Twenty20 International cricketers

References 

Test
Bangladesh